The Baku "N" Military Unit", also known informally as the Azerbaijani Peacekeeping Battalion is the primary peacekeeping unit of the Azerbaijani Land Forces.

History 
The Army's peacekeeping detachment was formed in 1997 and was later transformed into a battalion. Soldiers are carefully selected for the Baku N unit. Since September 1999 Azerbaijani servicemen acted within the NATO/U.S.-led Coalition intervention forces in Kosovo, Afghanistan and Iraq, moreover, they are serving under the command of the UN Mission in South Sudan. Azerbaijan also floated the idea of creating peacekeeping units to be deployed in separatist conflict areas of GUAM countries.

Personnel 
The unit is trained intensively on tactical preparation, sports, foreign languages, contacts with local residents and other subjects. After six months of training, members are sent to join peacekeeping operations.

Deployments

Kosovo 
The Azerbaijani peacekeeping unit in Kosovo (1 officer, 1 sergeant and 32 soldiers) carried service from September 1999 within the Turkish battalion. The Azerbaijanis oversaw eighteen settlements in the area. On 26 February 2008, as Kosovo declared its independence, Azerbaijani President Ilham Aliyev addressed the National Assembly to call for the withdrawal of Azerbaijani peacekeepers from Kosovo. The address was considered at Assembly session on 4 March 2008 and accepted with eighty seven votes in favor, three against and two abstainations.

On April 15 of the same year the platoon returned to Azerbaijan. Overall about 400 Azerbaijani servicemen have administered peacekeeping in Kosovo.

Iraq
Azerbaijani servicemen were deployed to Iraq as part of Combined Joint Task Force 7 in 2003. The peacekeeping unit consisted of 14 officers, 16 sergeants and 120 privates, who secured the hydroelectric power station and reservoir in Haditha from August 2003. One company of Azerbaijani peacekeepers commanded by Captain Nasimi Javadov guarded the area of Haditha Dam, which is one of the principal sources of electricity in Iraq. An Azerbaijani delegation headed by the Deputy Minister of Defense visited the Hadithah Dam at the invitation of the Marine Corps officials.

From 2004 the company became part of the USMC led Multi-National Forces West. Ilham Aliyev’s address to recall the Azerbaijani peacekeepers in Iraq was accepted at the plenary session of National Assembly by eighty six votes in favor and one against Four Azerbaijani officers in Iraq (Maj. Huseyn Dashdamirov, Capt. Nasimi Javadov, Capt. Alizamin Karimov and Sr. Lt. Abdulla Abdullayev) have been awarded the US Navy and Marines Corps Achievement Medal.

Afghanistan
Azerbaijan joined with platoon to International Security Assistance Force (ISAF) consisting of 21 soldiers, one officer and one NCO in November 2002 with the aim of contributing to provision of peace, security and order in Afghanistan.

The Azerbaijani platoon commanded by First Lieutenant Shamil Mammadov performed patrolling duties in the populated district of southern Kabul. On 2 October 2008 the National Assembly passed a decision to send 45 more peacekeepers to Afghanistan. In an interview to Azeri Press Agency Brigadier-General Richard Blanchette said:  "As the spokesperson for ISAF on behalf of General McKiernan, the Commander of ISAF, I thank your country, your soldiers, and the families of your soldiers, for their contribution to this vital mission". The number of peacekeepers serving in the Resolute Support mission in Afghanistan was raised from 94 to 120 on 9 January 2018, according to the amendment to the Resolution "On giving consent to the deployment and participation in the relevant operations in Afghanistan of a platoon of the Armed Forces of the Republic of Azerbaijan as part of the battalion of the Armed Forces of the Republic of Turkey and under the general command of NATO structures" by the Milli Majlis on 29 December 2017.

Unit casualties 
During the Iraq peacekeeping mission, one Azerbaijani serviceman (Rafael Agayev) died. He had served in Iraq for one year and on 27 June 2008, Agayev's body was sent to his homeland, where he was buried in his native village.

Gallery

See also 
 Azerbaijan - NATO relations
 Ministry of Defense of Azerbaijan

Notes

External links
Small country, big mission: Azerbaijanis complete tour in Iraq (Marines.mil)

Foreign relations of Azerbaijan
Military of Azerbaijan
Military units and formations established in 1997
Peacekeeping
Military units and formations of Azerbaijani Land Forces